The following are the national records in track cycling in Costa Rica, maintained by its national cycling federation, Federacion Costarricense de Ciclismo (FECOCI).

Men

Women

References

External links
 FECOCI website

Cost Rica
Records
Track cycling
track cycling